was a town located in Naka District, Tokushima Prefecture, Japan.

As of 2003, the town had an estimated population of 3,240 and a population density of 107.50 persons per km². The total area was 30.14 km².

On March 1, 2005, Wajiki, along with the towns of Aioi and Kaminaka, and the villages of Kisawa and Kito (all from Naka District), was merged to create the city of Naka.

External links 
  
 Wajiki official website (May 27, 2008 archive)

Dissolved municipalities of Tokushima Prefecture
Naka, Tokushima